Donyatt is a village and civil parish in Somerset, England, situated at the source of the River Isle  north of Chard in the South Somerset district. The village has a population of 347. The parish includes the hamlet of Peasmarsh.

History

The village was recorded as Dunnyete meaning Dunna's gate in 725.

In the Domesday Book a park at Donyatt was held by Drogo from the Count of Mortain.

Donyatt was part of the hundred of Abdick and Bulstone.

In 1328 it was the birthplace of William Montacute, 2nd Earl of Salisbury, whose family held the manor and built a castle or fortified manor house. It had a manorial chapel and it is from this that a Sheela na Gig was recovered and is now incorporated into a private house.

The almshouses in Church Street date from 1624, and were founded under the will of John Dunster of London (died 1625). Next to them is the old school house, which was built in the early 19th century, and the old school which dates from 1871.

The Old clay puddling house, a circular thatched building, is a former pottery dating from the 18th century, when there were also woollen-mills in the village. Thirty-three examples of pottery from Donyatt have been identified from five sites in Virginia and Maryland. They were part of a wider pottery industry during the 17th and 18th centuries. Sites from which were excavated in the 1960s and 1970.

The "Sea Bridge" carries the road over a stream. It was built in the 18th century with three semi-circular arches.

Donyatt had a small halt along the Chard Branch Line just before Ilminster, which served the local community, it was constructed from sleepers laid horizontally and pegged together to form a basic platform structure, a small over canopy "shed" served as a shelter during the winter months, access to the platform was gained by crossing over the bridge and accessing an inclined path. The Halt is next to some World War II defences used on the Taunton Stop Line, with anti-tank traps around the station. During the threat of invasion, an inspection post could be quickly set up between Donyatt and Ilminster to stop and check the trains before proceeding on the down line "to" and "from" Chard. This was achieved by placing a barrier on some cut out stones entering the Donyatt Halt, you can see these if you wonder why there are two opposite stones on the cycle path, one will have a hole cut into it to act as a pivot for the barrier.

In 2017, the village was part of an ITV News special, focussing on the 2017 United Kingdom general election and how it had repercussions for residents of the area.

Governance

The parish council has responsibility for local issues, including setting an annual precept (local rate) to cover the council's operating costs and producing annual accounts for public scrutiny. The parish council evaluates local planning applications and works with the local police, district council officers, and neighbourhood watch groups on matters of crime, security, and traffic. The parish council's role also includes initiating projects for the maintenance and repair of parish facilities, as well as consulting with the district council on the maintenance, repair, and improvement of highways, drainage, footpaths, public transport, and street cleaning. Conservation matters (including trees and listed buildings) and environmental issues are also the responsibility of the council.

The village falls within the Non-metropolitan district of South Somerset, which was formed on 1 April 1974 under the Local Government Act 1972, having previously been part of Chard Rural District. The district council is responsible for local planning and building control, local roads, council housing, environmental health, markets and fairs, refuse collection and recycling, cemeteries and crematoria, leisure services, parks, and tourism.

Somerset County Council is responsible for running the largest and most expensive local services such as education, social services, libraries, main roads, public transport, policing and fire services, trading standards, waste disposal and strategic planning.

It is also part of the Yeovil county constituency represented in the House of Commons of the Parliament of the United Kingdom. It elects one Member of Parliament (MP) by the first past the post system of election. It was part of the South West England constituency of the European Parliament prior to Britain leaving the European Union in January 2020, which elected seven MEPs using the d'Hondt method of party-list proportional representation.

Religious sites

The Anglican parish Church of St Mary is a 15th rebuild of earlier church, where the first recorded rector was in 1255. It has been designated as a grade II* listed building.

References

External links

 Map of the parish circa 1900

Villages in South Somerset
Civil parishes in Somerset